Theretra improvisa is a moth of the  family Sphingidae. It is known from Bioko.

The wingspan is about 50 mm. The forewings are very broad and the outer margin is strongly convex. The apex is sharply pointed and the inner margin strongly concave before the tornus. The upperside of the head and thorax is dark black-brown, but the thorax has a pale grey double line along each edge. The forewing upperside has a pale band running between the third and fourth postmedian lines and a pale band between the fourth and fifth postmedian lines which is strongly developed.

References

Theretra
Moths described in 2006